The World Famous Cannabis Cafe opened in Portland, Oregon, as the first cafe in the United States for state-authorized medical marijuana cardholders. Established in 2009 by Madeline Martinez, then the Executive Director of Oregon NORML, the Cannabis Cafe was established as a place for Oregon Medical Marijuana Program (OMMP) cardholders to socialize and safely medicate out of public view as required by state law. Members of the club had to be a current OMMP cardholder and pay an entry fee.

The cafe hosted a number of activities, including the annual Oregon Medical Cannabis Awards, which began in 2002. The OMCA was the first medical marijuana strain evaluation competition in the United States, and the only competition to track the medical conditions of the judges and medical effectiveness of the strains relative to specific conditions. The cafe also hosted a monthly (OMMP) Cardholder Meeting where the community of patients, caregivers and growers could stay up to date on legislative requirements and changes.

After the Oregon Indoor Clean Air Act was expanded to include marijuana smoking and vaping, Martinez confirmed that the cafe would close on March 8, 2016.

References

External links
Portland’s Cannabis Cafe is the First Marijuana Coffee Shop of Its Kind in the Country - video report by Democracy Now!

2009 establishments in Oregon
2009 in cannabis
2016 disestablishments in Oregon
American companies established in 2009
Cannabis companies of the United States
Cannabis in Oregon
Cannabis shops
Companies disestablished in 2016
Defunct companies based in Oregon
Restaurants established in 2009
Restaurants disestablished in 2016
Cannabis dispensaries in the United States